Missing is a 2023 American screenlife thriller film written and directed by Will Merrick and Nick Johnson (in their feature directorial debuts) from a story by Sev Ohanian and Aneesh Chaganty, who also produced the film with Natalie Qasabian. The film is a standalone sequel to Searching (2018). It stars Storm Reid, Joaquim de Almeida, Ken Leung, Amy Landecker, Daniel Henney, and Nia Long. Its plot follows June Allen, a teenager who tries to find her missing mother after she disappears on vacation in Colombia with her new boyfriend.

An anthology sequel to Searching was announced in 2019, with Merrick and Johnson, who edited the first film, signing on to make their directorial debuts in January 2021. Reid and Long joined the cast in the spring of 2021, and filming took place in Los Angeles from March to May that year after delays due to the ongoing COVID-19 pandemic. Missing also serves as a spiritual sequel to Run (2020), directed by Searching director Chaganty and edited by Merrick and Johnson, confirming the fates of that film's characters.

Missing had its premiere at the Sundance Film Festival on January 19, 2023, and was released in the United States the following day, by Sony Pictures Releasing. The film received generally positive reviews from critics and has grossed $45 million at the box office.

Plot 
In an archive video, a young June Allen is with her deceased father James, who died from a brain tumor shortly after the video was made. Years later, June's mother Grace leaves for a week-long trip to Cartagena, Colombia, with her boyfriend Kevin, leaving June in the care of Grace's friend Heather, a divorce lawyer who expresses some jealousy at Grace's relationship with Kevin.

A week later, June is tasked with retrieving her mother and Kevin from Los Angeles International Airport, but they never arrive. June contacts the FBI, but later decides to investigate herself using an array of digital tools at her disposal. She also hires Javier, a Colombian gig worker who complies with June's requests for a small fee.

Upon hacking into Kevin's Gmail account, June discovers a number of aliases and a criminal record of scamming many women for their money. Believing Kevin to have kidnapped her mother, June has Javier look for clues as to their whereabouts in Colombia. She traces Kevin's past movements to a location in Nevada, where she talks to Jimmy, a man claiming to be a pastor at a Christian rehabilitation center for ex-convicts. He tells her that Kevin has been rehabilitated and is genuinely in love with Grace. June eventually accesses her mother's online dating profile, where past messages reveal that her mother was already aware of Kevin's past.

FBI agent Elijah Park informs June that he received footage of a band of criminals seemingly kidnapping Kevin and Grace in Colombia. June uncovers this as a fabricated event, as Kevin had hired a lookalike actress named Rachel Page to impersonate her mother, who had been kidnapped en route to the airport beforehand. As the case makes national headlines, Rachel confesses she was unaware of Kevin's intentions when she accompanied him to Colombia. It revealed that Grace has had multiple aliases as well, sparking speculation that she had something to do with her own disappearance. Swearing by her mother's innocence, June's suspicions fall on Heather when she discovers an encrypted line of communication between her and Kevin. June sneaks into Heather's office but finds it ransacked and with files deleted. She then discovers Heather's corpse in a storage closet.

Later, June views live footage of a police raid in Colombia focusing on Kevin, who is shot and killed despite surrendering. Seemingly at a dead end, June is about to give up but manages to access her mother's e-mail. She finds a threatening e-mail directed at Grace, which leads her to discover security cameras that Kevin bought to install at an abandoned house, which happens to be her old vacation home in Nevada. Just then, Jimmy calls June and indicates he has some information about Grace.

Jimmy arrives and reveals that he is June's father and that Grace was emotionally unstable and took June away from him after having him arrested under false charges. However, he also unwittingly reveals himself as a domestic abuser whose drug habit endangered all of them; Grace and Heather had told June he died of cancer to shield her from the truth. James sought revenge by enlisting Kevin, whom he met in prison, to pose as a prospective boyfriend so he could find Grace and June.

James kidnaps June and takes her to the old house, where Grace is also detained. They reunite before Grace is shot by James. James tries to leave with June, but Grace fatally stabs him in the neck with a shard of broken glass. June, realizing James never shut off her laptop when he kidnapped her, uses the cameras to tell Siri to call the police.

Several months later, Grace has survived her gunshot wound, and June is in college. Their story has been adapted on the true crime show Unfiction, and Grace has started a friendship with Javier after June introduced them. June texts her mother that she loves her, and Grace responds that she loves her too.

Cast 
 Storm Reid as June Allen
 Ava Zaria Lee as young June
 Joaquim de Almeida as Javier
 Ken Leung as Kevin
 Amy Landecker as Heather
 Megan Suri as Veena
 Tim Griffin as James
 Daniel Henney as Agent Park
 Nia Long as Grace Allen
 Michael Segovia as Angel
 Lauren B. Mosley as Rachel 
 Tracy Vilar as Detective Gomez

Production 
In August 2019, a standalone sequel to Searching (2018) was announced to be in development, with the original film's director, Aneesh Chaganty, clarifying that the story would not "follow the same characters or plot line as the original", making the series an anthology. In November 2020, producer Natalie Qasabian said the COVID-19 pandemic had postponed production on the film, simply going under the title Searching 2. In January 2021, it was announced that Will Merrick and Nick Johnson, the editors on the first film and Chaganty's Run (2020), would write and direct the film in their directorial debuts, with additional literary material by Micah Ariel Watson, and producer of Unfriended and Searching Timur Bekmambetov to executive produce the sequel with Ohanian, Chaganty, and Qasabian. In the following months, Storm Reid and Nia Long joined the cast. 

Principal photography took place from March 30 to May 30, 2021, in Los Angeles, California. In September 2022, the film's title was revealed to be Missing, with the film set for a 2023 release date. In November 2022, producer and co-story writer Sev Ohanian revealed on Reddit that the film would also be set after Run, serving as an epilogue to the events of that film as well as a continuation of Searching.

Release 
Missing was theatrically released in the United States on January 20, by Sony Pictures Releasing under their Screen Gems banner. It was originally scheduled for February 24, 2023.

Home media
Missing was released on Amazon Prime Video on March 7, 2023. The DVD and Blu-ray are expected to be released on March 28, 2023.

Reception

Box office 
, Missing has grossed $32.5 million in the United States and Canada, and $12.6 million in other territories, for a worldwide total of $45.1 million.

Missing made $3.4 million on its first day, including $760,000 from Thursday night previews. It went on to debut to a $9.2 million weekend, finishing fourth behind holdovers Avatar: The Way of Water, Puss in Boots: The Last Wish and M3GAN. The film made $5.7 million in its second weekend, finishing in sixth.

Critical response 
  Audiences surveyed by CinemaScore gave the film an average grade of "B" on an A+ to F scale, while those polled by PostTrak gave it an 81% positive score, with 60% saying they would definitely recommend it.

See also
 List of films featuring surveillance

References

External links 
 
 

2023 films
2023 thriller films
2020s mystery thriller films
African-American films
American mystery thriller films
Bazelevs Company films
Films about domestic violence
Films about kidnapping in the United States
Films about missing people
Films about mother–daughter relationships
Films set in 2022
Films set in Los Angeles
Films shot in Los Angeles
Screenlife films
Screen Gems films
Stage 6 Films films